The 1992–93 English Hockey League season took place from October 1992 until March 1993.

The Men's National League was sponsored by PizzaExpress and won by Hounslow. The Women's National League was won by Ipswich.

The Men's Hockey Association Cup was won by Hounslow and the AEWHA Cup was won by Leicester.

Men's Pizza Express National League First Division League Standings

Women's National League Premier Division League Standings

Men's Royal Bank of Scotland Cup (Hockey Association Cup)

Quarter-finals

Semi-finals 

Teddington won on Penalty strokes*

Final 
(Held at Stantonbury Leisure Centre, Milton Keynes on 2 May)

Hounslow
Jason Barrow, Mike Williamson, Scott Hobson, Paul Bolland, Guy Swayne, Jon Potter, David Hacker, Jon Rees, Nick Gordon, Robert Thompson, Bobby Crutchley
Teddington
Garry Meredith, D Cross, Tony Colclough, Jon Royce, Jimmy Wallis, Jason Laslett (capt), Tyrone Moore, Mark Riley, Jon Hauck, Phil McGuire, Andy Bilson

Women's Cup (AEWHA Cup)

Quarter-finals

Semi-finals

Final 
(Held at Milton Keynes on 16 May) 

Leicester
A Claxton, Emma Newbold, Sue Holwell, Joanne Mould, Kathy Johnson, S Saunders, Gill Moss, Mary Nevill, M Laird, Kim Gordon, Justine Williams subs Gaynor Nash, Lucy Cope, S Naylor
Ealing
Sue Lawrie, Katie Dodd, Sarah Lawfull, Mandy Nicholls, Sally Eyre, Anne Green, Liz Moors, J Hurt, J Caudwell, K Harvey, Rachel O'Grady subs R O'Brien, H North

References 

1992
field hockey
field hockey
1993 in field hockey
1992 in field hockey